The Claiborne-Annapolis Ferry Company ran both passenger and automobile ferry service across the Chesapeake Bay from 1919 to 1952. The initial service was between Annapolis, Maryland, on the western shore and Claiborne, Maryland, on the eastern shore. In July 1930, a second shorter route was added between Annapolis, Maryland, and Matapeake on Kent Island, Maryland. Business increased so rapidly at that point that another ferryboat was added. In May, 1938 the Claiborne route was changed to run from Claiborne to Romancoke, Maryland, on the lower end of Kent Island, from which passengers could then connect to the Matapeake to Annapolis run. In 1943, the Annapolis United States Naval Academy absorbed the property where the ferry terminal had been, so service was switched from Annapolis to a new terminal at Sandy Point on the western shore. By May 1951, the ferries were handling 1 million vehicles and 2 million passengers annually. Ferry service stopped running in 1952 when the Chesapeake Bay Bridge was completed.

History
The first Claiborne-Annapolis ferry was operated by the Eastern Shore Development Steamship Company from 1912 to 1916, until it entered liquidation and ceased operations.

The first run by the Claiborne-Annapolis Ferry Company (under its earlier name Claiborne-Annapolis Ferry, Inc.) was June 19, 1919, with the  sidewheeler Gov. Emerson C. Harrington, named for the 48th Governor of Maryland and later President of the Claiborne-Annapolis Ferry Company. As governor, Harrington had been instrumental in getting the ferry started. In 1915, the State Roads Commission had appropriated $50,000 to establish a state-owned ferry. With the beginning of World War I, planning was put on hold until 1919. At that time a group of businessmen headed by Hampden D. Mepham, originally from St. Louis but then living in New York City, and Frank McNamee, of Albany, and at the urging of Gov. Harrington, formed a private company named the Claiborne-Annapolis Ferry, Inc.  The state funds were instead diverted toward subsidizing the new private company. The "Old Harrington", as the boat became known, made two round trips daily, crossing the Chesapeake Bay in 1 hour 20 minutes.

In 1921, the company struggling financially, but Gov. Harrington, his term as Governor over, became President of the company and instituted reforms to make it more profitable.  Not until 1924 did the company begin to see receipts exceed expenses, in part because the competing Baltimore, Chesapeake & Atlantic Railway ferry from Baltimore to Claiborne ceased operations.  In 1921, a bus route was added to carry passengers to Easton, Hurlock, and Cambridge. In 1928 the assets of the company was acquired by a new company established for that purpose, the Claiborne-Annapolis Ferry Company.

The Gov. Emerson C. Harrington was retired in 1937 and replaced by the Gov. Emerson C. Harrington II, a double-ender with a coal-fired steam engine, until it was converted to diesel power in 1944/45. Other boats were to include the General Lincoln (1920-1922), Majestic (1923-1927), Gov. Albert C. Ritchie (1926-1944), John M. Dennis (1929-1952), Gov. Harry W. Nice (1938-1952), Gov. Herbert R. O'Conor (1948-1952), and the B. Frank Sherman (1949-1952), the last named for the company's General Manager from 1924-1952. The last two boats, technically, were never part of the Claiborne Annapolis Ferry Company and never served either Claiborne or Annapolis itself. Instead they operated exclusively on the Sandy Point-Matapeake route.

Serious discussion about building a bridge across the Chesapeake Bay had been around since at least 1907, but did not take hold until the 1930s.  Since the bridge would put the ferry out of business, the State decided it had an obligation to the ferry owners to purchase the company.  In 1941, the company was purchased for $1,023,000 by the Maryland State Roads Commission (now the Maryland State Highway Administration), and was renamed the Chesapeake Bay Ferry System.

At the time the company was purchased by the State Roads Commission, it had approximately 120 employees.

Service on the ferry was continued across the Chesapeake Bay until July 30, 1952, the same day the new Chesapeake Bay Bridge was opened.  During a final run by the John M. Dennis a few weeks before the bridge opening, it "accidentally" rammed the new bridge [Variations on the cause of the "accident" can be found between newspaper accounts and recollections by family members of the ship's Captain Edward C. Higgins].  The last run from Claiborne to Romancoke was on December 31, 1952, by the Gov. Emerson C. Harrington II.

Ferries

Other miscellaneous photographs

References

"Denton Journal", 4 Mar 1916
"Denton Journal", 10 May 1919. article: "Ferry opened Thursday"
"Denton Journal", 21 Jun 1919. article: "The Claiborne-Annapolis ferry is in operation"
"Denton Journal", 11 Jul 1952. article: "Ferry Rams Bridge Pier; Boat Damaged"
"The Sunday Sun", 27 Jul 1952. article: "The First Ferry On The Bay"
"Evening Star", 28 Jul 1952. article: "Chesapeake Ferry Boatmen Sadly Face Uncertain Future"
"Easton Star-Democrat", 9 Jan 1953. article: "Rainy, Cold New Year's Eve Is Setting For Farewell Trip"
"Easton Star-Democrat", 13 Nov 1953. article: "Two Bay Ferries Head For Seattle"
"Steamboat Bill", Sept 1942. "The Chesapeake Bay Ferry System", by H. Graham Wood
Notes of B. Frank Sherman. On file at Chesapeake Bay Maritime Museum, Library. St. Michaels, MD.
Railroad ferries of the Hudson: and stories of a deckhand, by Raymond J. Baxter, Arthur G. Adams

Transportation in Maryland